Abdul Karim Burjas al-Rawi (died 14 June 2022) was the first post-invasion Governor of Iraq's Al Anbar province, serving until July 2004, when he resigned.

Biography
Shortly after the invasion in 2003, Sunni tribal leaders and former Ba'athists, led by members of the Al-Kharbit (Khalifa) and Al-Gaoud (Nimr) families met to select Karim Burjas, a former General, as their unofficial leader and new Governor of Anbar Province. Burjas's position was later recognized by the coalition.

Barjas resigned in July 2004 after his 3 sons were released in Fallujah by militants who had been holding them. The militants responsible then released a video on 5 August 2004 showing Barjas resigning and apologizing for opposing the Iraqi insurgency. In the video Barjas stated, "I am Abd al-Karim Barjas, governor of Al-Anbar. I declare before God and you my repentance of any action I did against the mujahedin, and I announce my resignation of my post." The US subsequently announced it would not make concessions to hostage takers. The militants responsible were believed to be members of al-Qaeda in Iraq.

Following his resignation he retired from public service.

After his resignation an interim governor filled the role of Governor of Anbar. Faisal Raikan al-Gut al-Nimrawi served as interim Governor until being forced out by tribal leaders in January 2005, and the Provincial Governing Council subsequently appointed Raja Nawaf Farhan al-Mahalawi as the new Governor.

References

20th-century births
2022 deaths
20th-century Iraqi politicians
21st-century Iraqi politicians
Governors of Al Anbar Governorate
Year of birth missing